The Soviet Union's 1985 nuclear test series was a group of 10 nuclear tests conducted in 1985. These tests  followed the 1984 Soviet nuclear tests series and preceded the 1987 Soviet nuclear tests series.

References

1985
1985 in the Soviet Union
1985 in military history
Explosions in 1985